In Fijian mythology, Tui Delai Gau is the god of mountains who can remove his hands and have them fish for him. He can also take off his head and put it in the sky as a look-out.  He lives in a tree.

Sources

Further reading 
 

Fijian deities
Nature gods